Bradley A. Swanson is a retired United States Air Force major general who last served as the director of exercises and training of the United States Central Command.

References

Living people
Place of birth missing (living people)
Recipients of the Legion of Merit
United States Air Force generals
United States Air Force personnel of the Gulf War
United States Air Force personnel of the Iraq War
Year of birth missing (living people)